Persoonia bargoensis, commonly known as the Bargo geebung, is a species of flowering plant in the family Proteaceae and is endemic to a restricted area of New South Wales. It is an erect shrub with linear to lance-shaped leaves, yellow, tube-shaped flowers and green, pear-shaped fruit.

Description
The flowers are arranged in groups of up to twenty in leaf axils or on the ends of branchlets that continue to grow after flowering.

Taxonomy
Persoonia bargoensis was first formally described in 1991 by Peter Weston and Lawrie Johnson of the National Herbarium of New South Wales from material collected near Douglas Park in 1989. They had previously considered it an intermediate form between Persoonia nutans, that is found  to the north, and P. oxycoccoides, found  to the south. However further study found no evidence of intermediate forms between it and the other two species. Within the genus, P. bargoensis is classified in the Lanceolata group, a group of 58 closely related species with similar flowers but very different foliage. These species will often interbreed with each other where two members of the group occur.

Distribution and habitat
It grows in dry sclerophyll eucalypt forest, under forest red gum (Eucalyptus tereticornis) and broad-leaved red ironbark (E. fibrosa) with a grassy understory of kangaroo grass (Themeda triandra), or more open woodland with such trees as red bloodwood (Corymbia gummifera), scribbly gum (Eucalyptus sclerophylla), grey gum (E. punctata), narrow-leaved stringybark (E. sparsifolia) and small-leaved apple (Angophora bakeri) with a shrubby understory of plants such as wreath bush-pea (Pultenaea tuberculata). The increased light and lack of competing plants means the species adapts preferably to growing on road verges.

Conservation status
This geebung is classified as "vulnerable" under the Australian Government Environment Protection and Biodiversity Conservation Act 1999 and as "endangered" under the New South Wales Government Biodiversity Conservation Act 2016. The main threats to the species include its small population size, habitat loss and fragmentation and inappropriate maintenance activities.

References

bargoensis
Flora of New South Wales
Plants described in 1991
Taxa named by Peter H. Weston
Taxa named by Lawrence Alexander Sidney Johnson